The Bi Fang is a mythological bird, encountered in Chinese mythology. The Bi Fang is thought to have one leg. However, sources vary in terms of its description.

Hanfeizi
Han Fei dates back to the third century BCE.The Bi Fang bird is described by Han Fei, in his work Hanfeizi. According to the Hanfeizi the Bi Fang is an auspicious bird which was a companion to Huangdi (the "Yellow Emperor") (Strassberg 2002, 110).

Shanhaijing
The Shanhaijing also known as the Classic of Mountains and Seas is of indeterminate age, yet a perennial favourite. The commentary by Guo Pu is subsequent. The Bi Fang bird is item sixty-nine. The Bi Fang is described here as one-legged, crane-like, red markings on green, white-beaked, named by onomatopoiesis by the sound it makes, and an omen of fire (Strassberg 2002, 110–111). According to the Shanhaijing and it's commentaries, the Bifang can be found on Mount Zhang'e and/or east of the Feathered People (Youmin) and west of the Blue River (Strassberg 2002, 110 and 163).

Huainanzi
The Bi Fang bird is described in the Huainanzi, developed by various persons associated with the circle around Liu An, ruler of Huainan, dating back to the second century BCE. Huainanzi associates the Bi Fang bird with the Wu Xing element Wood (Strassberg 2002, 110–111)

See also
Birds in Chinese mythology
Chinese mythology
Crane in Chinese mythology
Shangyang (rainbird)

References
Strassberg, Richard E., editor, translator, and comments. 2002 [2018]. A Chinese Bestiary: Strange Creatures from the GUIDEWAYS THROUGH MOUNTAINS AND SEAS. Berkeley and Los Angeles: University of California Press. 

Mythological and legendary Chinese birds
Yaoguai
Legendary creatures with absent body parts